Karlsruhe-Land is an electoral constituency (German: Wahlkreis) represented in the Bundestag. It elects one member via first-past-the-post voting. Under the current constituency numbering system, it is designated as constituency 272. It is located in northwestern Baden-Württemberg, comprising the central and southern parts of the Landkreis Karlsruhe district.

Karlsruhe-Land was created for the inaugural 1949 federal election. It was abolished in 1965 and re-established in the 1980 federal election. Since 2021, it has been represented by Nicolas Zippelius of the Christian Democratic Union (CDU).

Geography
Karlsruhe-Land is located in northwestern Baden-Württemberg. As of the 2021 federal election, it comprises the Landkreis Karlsruhe district excluding the municipalities of Bad Schönborn, Bruchsal, Forst, Hambrücken, Karlsdorf-Neuthard, Kronau, Oberhausen-Rheinhausen, Östringen, Philippsburg, Ubstadt-Weiher, and Waghäusel.

History
Karlsruhe-Land was created in 1949. In the 1949 election, it was Württemberg-Baden Landesbezirk Baden constituency 4 in the number system. In the 1953 through 1961 elections, it was number 178. Originally, it comprised the independent city of Pforzheim, the Landkreis Pforzheim district, and the Landkreis Karlsruhe district excluding the municipalities of Bretten, Oberderdingen, and Walzbachtal.

Karlsruhe-Land was abolished in the 1965 election. Its area was divided between the new constituencies of Pforzheim – Karlsruhe-Land I and Bruchsal – Karlsruhe-Land II.

Karlsruhe-Land was re-established in the 1980 election. In the 1980 through 1998 elections, it was constituency 176. In the 2002 and 2005 elections, it was number 273. Since the 2009 election, it has been number 272. In the 1980 through 1998 elections, it comprised the Landkreis Karlsruhe district excluding the municipalities of Ettlingen, Malsch, Oberderdingen, and Rheinstetten. It acquired its current borders in the 2002 election.

Members
The constituency has been held continuously by the Christian Democratic Union (CDU) throughout both its incarnations. It was first represented by Gottfried Leonhard from 1949 until its abolition in 1965. After its re-establishment, it was represented by Klaus Bühler from 1980 to 2002. Axel Fischer was representative from 2002 to 2021. He was succeeded by Nicolas Zippelius in 2021.

Election results

2021 election

2017 election

2013 election

2009 election

References

Federal electoral districts in Baden-Württemberg
1949 establishments in West Germany
1980 establishments in West Germany
Constituencies established in 1949
Constituencies established in 1980
Karlsruhe (district)